Brian Lambert (10 July 1936 − 27 December 2007) was an English footballer who played professionally at Mansfield Town as a full-back between 1954 and 1960. Lambert played mostly for the Stags' reserve team, and made only 28 appearances for the first team in his six years at Field Mill.

As a youngster, Lambert was briefly connected to Derby County as an amateur, but never played for the Rams at first-team level. He joined Mansfield from non-league neighbours Sutton Town in October 1954, and rejoined Sutton when he left the Stags in 1960. After his retirement from professional football, he worked as a window cleaner in Ashfield.

He died in December 2007, aged 71.

References

1936 births
2007 deaths
English footballers
Mansfield Town F.C. players
Sutton Town A.F.C. players
Association football fullbacks